Halytskyi District is an urban district of the city of Lviv, named after Ruthenian king and founder of the city Daniel of Galicia (Danylo Halytskyi). Halytskyi District covers territory of Old City with the center in Market Square and some other central neighborhoods like Snopkiv, Sofiyivka and Citadel.

See also
Subdivisions of Ukraine

Urban districts of Lviv